Daniel Zaïdani (born 14 May 1975) is a Mayotte politician, who has served as the President of the Members of the Departmental Council of Mayotte since succeeding Ahmed Attoumani Douchina on 3 April 2011.

References 

Living people
1975 births
Presidents of the General Council of Mayotte
Members of the Departmental Council of Mayotte
Mayotte politicians
People from Mayotte